is a stable of sumo wrestlers, one of the Nishonoseki group of stables. In its modern form, it dates from September 1955, when it was set up by former komusubi Kotonishiki Noboru. Former yokozuna Kotozakura took over the running of the stable in 1974 following Kotonishiki's death. The stable is located in Matsudo, Chiba prefecture. Over the next thirty years the stable produced a string of top division wrestlers. Kotozakura stood down in November 2005, handing the stable over to his son-in-law, former sekiwake Kotonowaka.

Between September 2007 and July 2010, it became the first stable since Musashigawa stable in 2001 to have two wrestlers ranked at ōzeki simultaneously, with Kotomitsuki and Kotoōshū. It happened again between November 2011 and November 2013 with Kotoōshū and Kotoshōgiku. As of January 2023 the stable has 26 wrestlers, three of them  being sekitori. In March 2020 Sadogatake-oyakata'''s son, who also goes by the name of Kotonowaka, reached the top makuuchi division. On the May 2020 banzuke all five sekitori were ranked in the top division, although none were above maegashira 13. The most the stable has ever had in makuuchi simultaneously is seven, in November 1992 and January 1993.

In January 2021, junior wrestler Kotokantetsu retired and publicly criticized Sadogatake-oyakata for not supporting him during his sumo career and not allowing him to sit out that month's honbasho despite his fears of contracting COVID-19.

Ring name conventions
Virtually all wrestlers at this stable take ring names or shikona that begin with the character 琴 (read: koto), in deference to the founder, Kotonishiki, and the owners who followed him.

Owners
2005–present: 13th Sadogatake (riji, former sekiwake Kotonowaka)
1974–2005: 12th Sadogatake (the 53rd yokozuna, Kotozakura)
1955–1974: 11th Sadogatake (former komusubi Kotonishiki)

Notable active wrestlers

Kotoekō (best rank maegashira)
Kotonowaka, (best rank komusubi, son of Sadogatake-oyakata)
Kotoshōhō (best rank maegashira)

Coaches
Hidenoyama Kazuhiro (iin, former ōzeki Kotoshōgiku)
Kumegawa Yoshikiro (iin, former komusubi Kotoinazuma)
Shiratama Katsuyuki (iin, former maegashira Kototsubaki)
Hamakaze Hideaki (iin, former maegashira Gojōrō)

Assistant
Kotochitose (wakaimonogashira, former maegashira, real name Minoru Yamamoto )

Notable former members
Kotogahama (former ōzeki)
Kotokaze (former ōzeki)
Kotomitsuki (former ōzeki)
Kotoōshū (former ōzeki)
Kotoshōgiku (former ōzeki)
Kotogaume (former sekiwake)
Hasegawa (former sekiwake)
Kotonishiki (former sekiwake)
Kotonowaka (former sekiwake)
Kotofuji (former sekiwake)
Kotoyūki (former sekiwake)
Kotobeppu (former maegashira)
Kotokasuga (former maegashira)
Kotoryū (former maegashira)
Kototenzan (later known as the professional wrestler Earthquake)

Referees
Shikimori Kinosuke (makushita gyōji, real name Kazuki Ikegami)
Shikimori Shihō (Makushita gyōji, real name Hitoshi Fukuda)

Ushers
Kotozō (makuuchi yobidashi, real name Tsuyoshi Tsuma)
Kotoyoshi (makuuchi yobidashi, real name Masaki Takahashi)

Hairdresser
Tokoazuma (4th tokoyama)
Tokohibiki (5th class tokoyama'')

Location and access
Chiba prefecture, Matsudo City, Kushizaki Minamicho 39
7 minute walk from Matsuhidai Station on the Hokusō Line

See also
List of sumo stables
List of active sumo wrestlers
List of past sumo wrestlers
Glossary of sumo terms

References

External links 
Japan Sumo Association profile
Official site

Active sumo stables